The Augmentation of Benefices Act 1677 (29 Car 2 c 8) was an Act of the Parliament of England.

The whole Act was repealed by section 1 of, and Part II of the Schedule to, the Statute Law (Repeals) Act 1971.

References
Halsbury's Statutes,

Acts of the Parliament of England
1677 in law
1677 in England